Leucopogon obovatus is a species of flowering plant in the heath family Ericaceae and is endemic to the southwest of Western Australia. It is an erect shrub with hairy young branchlets, variably-shaped, simple leaves, and erect clusters of 3 to 15 white, bell-shaped flowers on the ends of branches and in upper leaf axils.

Description
The upper surface of the leaves is shiny, the lower surface a paler shade of green.

Taxonomy and naming
This species was first formally described in 1805 by Jacques Labillardière who gave it the name Styphelia obovata in his Novae Hollandiae Plantarum Specimen. In 1810, Robert Brown changed the name to Leucopogon obovatus in his Prodromus Florae Novae Hollandiae. The specific epithet (obovatus) means "inverted egg-shaped", referring to the leaves.

In 2011, Michael Hislop described two subspecies of L. obovatus in the journal Nuytsia and the names are accepted by the Australian Plant Census:
 Leucopogon obovatus (Labill.)
 Leucopogon obovatus subsp. revolutus (R.Br.)

Distribution and habitat
Subspecies obovatus grows in heath or low woodland in near-coastal areas between West Cape Howe and Israelite Bay and subsp. revolutus
is found in winter-wet heath, woodland and forest from near Margaret River to near Albany and north to near Manjimup in the Esperance Plains, Jarrah Forest and Warren bioregions of south-western Western Australia.

Conservation status
Both subspecies of Leucopogon obovatus are listed as "not threatened" by the Western Australian Government Department of Biodiversity, Conservation and Attractions.

Ecology
This leucopogon attracts a parrot, Platycercus icterotis icterotis, commonly known as moyadong, that eats the fruit.

References

obovatus
Ericales of Australia
Eudicots of Western Australia
Plants described in 1805
Taxa named by Jacques Labillardière